Rex Johnston (born 1950) is an Australian international lawn bowler.

Bowls career

World Championships
Johnston won two bronze medals in the pairs and fours at the 1996 World Outdoor Bowls Championship in Adelaide. He won a silver medal in the triples at the 2000 World Outdoor Bowls Championship in Johannesburg.

Commonwealth Games
In addition he has appeared at four Commonwealth Games, winning a gold medal at the 1994 Commonwealth Games, and a silver at the 1998 Commonwealth Games and won he pairs title at the Australian National Bowls Championships in 1987.

Other
He won nine medals at the Asia Pacific Bowls Championships including six gold medals. In 1989, he won the Hong Kong International Bowls Classic pairs title.

Coaching and awards
He coached Malta at the 2006 Commonwealth Games, and from 2009-11 he was the Australian National Coach.

In October 2017 he was entered into the Bowls Australia Sporting Hall of Fame as one of only three "legends" of the sport.

References

1950 births
Living people
Bowls players at the 1990 Commonwealth Games
Bowls players at the 1994 Commonwealth Games
Bowls players at the 1998 Commonwealth Games
Bowls players at the 2002 Commonwealth Games
Australian male bowls players
Commonwealth Games gold medallists for Australia
Commonwealth Games silver medallists for Australia
Commonwealth Games medallists in lawn bowls
Bowls World Champions
20th-century Australian people
Medallists at the 1994 Commonwealth Games
Medallists at the 1998 Commonwealth Games